"What I Wanna" is a song by British rapper MoStack that appears on his debut studio album Stacko. It was released as a single through Virgin EMI on 28 February 2018, peaking at number 31 on the UK Singles Chart. The song was written by MoStack, Darius Forde, James Grant and Brenda Russell, and produced by iLL BLU.

In December 2019, the British Phonographic Industry certified the song gold for equivalent sales of 400,000 units.

Track listing

Charts

Certifications

References

2018 singles
2018 songs
MoStack songs
Songs written by Brenda Russell
Songs written by MoStack